"All That" is a song recorded by Canadian singer Carly Rae Jepsen for her third studio album, Emotion (2015), included as its fifth track. It was written by Jepsen, Ariel Rechtshaid and Dev Hynes, with the latter two also handling production.

Upon its release, "All That" was praised for the 1980s influence in the song. Jepsen debuted the song at Saturday Night Live on 4 April 2015 and it became available to digital retailers the next day on 5 April 2015, as the record's first promotional single.

Background
Jepsen began combing through Dev Hynes' discography after becoming infatuated with "Losing You" by Solange, to which she found his name listed in its production credits. Jepsen sought to work with him, stating she was a fan, which Hynes hesitated to believe. He was eventually "won over" by Jepsen's demonstration of her vocal ability and work ethic, and credited her with genuine intentions of "[developing] a new aesthetic" versus pursuing "Pitchfork-approved artists" for the sake of indie credibility. The pair worked in a Chelsea studio between Jepsen's Cinderella performances. Jepsen was sent a demo of "All That" where she wrote the bridge and produced the vocals herself, and Ariel Rechtshaid was brought in for additional work. In an interview with NPR, Jepsen called the song "probably [her] favorite song from the album".

Live performances
Jepsen served as musical guest during an episode of Saturday Night Live on 4 April 2015, and performed "I Really Like You" and "All That". In 2016, she performed the song at the YouTube Space in Los Angeles and Pitchfork Music Festival, both times accompanied by Dev Hynes.

Critical reception

Pitchfork Media awarded "All That" their "Best New Track" feature, calling the song's conclusion a "tour de force climax". They add that the chorus has "innocence set against its absence" and makes "finding a friend feels like a profound step beyond becoming lovers".

Year-end lists

Track listings
Digital download/streaming
"All That" — 4:38

Digital download/streaming (Remix)
"All That" (The Knocks Remix) — 5:10

Release history

References

2015 songs
Carly Rae Jepsen songs
Songs written by Carly Rae Jepsen
Songs written by Dev Hynes
Interscope Records singles
604 Records singles
Pop ballads
2015 singles
Song recordings produced by Ariel Rechtshaid
Songs written by Ariel Rechtshaid
Song recordings produced by Dev Hynes